Hester Margaret Kaplan is an American short story writer, and novelist.

Life
Kaplan was born to a Jewish family, the daughter of novelist Anne (née Bernays) and author Justin Kaplan. Her maternal grandparents were Doris Fleischman and Edward Bernays, "the father of public relations" and nephew of Sigmund Freud. She grew up in Cambridge and graduated from Barnard College.

She has taught writing at Rhode Island School of Design and teaches at Lesley University.

Her work appeared in Ploughshares, Story, Glimmer Train,  and  Agni, "The Private Life of Skin", appeared in Southwest Review.

In 1987, she married Dr. Michael Stein. She is the mother of two sons, Alex and Toby.

Awards
 1999 Flannery O'Connor Award for Short Fiction
 Rhode Island State Council on the Arts Fellowship
 2008 National Endowment for the Arts Fellowship

Works

Anthologies
 
 The Best American Short Stories, 1998.

Work appearing in Ploughshares
"Goodwell", Ploughshares, Spring 1989
"Companion Animal", Ploughshares, Spring 2003

References

External links
Official website

Living people
American women short story writers
Barnard College alumni
Year of birth missing (living people)
American people of Austrian-Jewish descent
American people of Russian-Jewish descent
American women novelists
Jewish American novelists
Lesley University faculty
20th-century American novelists
20th-century American women writers
20th-century American short story writers
Novelists from Massachusetts
Bernays family
Freud family